Barbara Sutton née Barbara Giles is a retired female badminton player from England.

Career
She won a bronze medal at the 1980 IBF World Championships in women's doubles with Karen Bridge.

She represented England and won a gold medal in the team event and a bronze medal in the mixed doubles, at the 1978 Commonwealth Games in Edmonton, Alberta, Canada.

She married fellow badminton player Eddy Sutton in 1977.

References

English female badminton players
Living people
Year of birth missing (living people)
Badminton players at the 1978 Commonwealth Games
Commonwealth Games medallists in badminton
Commonwealth Games gold medallists for England
Commonwealth Games bronze medallists for England
Medallists at the 1978 Commonwealth Games